Monsterifik is the debut solo album, from Big Scoob, an American rapper from Kansas City, Missouri. The studio album was released on September 15, 2009. It is the second album to be released on the Strange Music label under the "Tech N9ne Presents" banner. The first of which was labelmate Krizz Kaliko's debut solo album, Vitiligo, in 2008.

Three singles were released for the album. "Bet I Don't" featuring B-Legit and Txx Will and "Big Fella" were both released on August 18, 2009, as digital singles. A music video was filmed for the third single, "Salue" featuring Tech N9ne, and the video was released on the Strange Music YouTube page on September 11, 2009.

The album contained several featured guests. Tech N9ne, whose name was attached to the project as the presenter, was credited as a feature on three of the album's tracks. Other Strange Music artists, Krizz Kaliko and Kutt Calhoun, also were featured on the album. Skatterman, a former member of the Strange Music label, was also credited with a feature. Bakarri (as Mr. Whitebear) and Txx Will, two members of the 57th Street Rogue Dog  which Big Scoob is a member of as well, also made appearances on the album. Among the other guests on the album were 8Ball & MJG, B-Legit, Johnny Richter of the Kottonmouth Kings, 1 Ton of Potluck and Irv Da Phenom.

Track listing

References

Big Scoob albums
2009 albums
Albums produced by Seven (record producer)
Strange Music albums